Linnéfjella is a mountain ridge in Nordenskiöld Land at Spitsbergen, Svalbard. It is named after Swedish botanist Carl Linnaeus. The ridge contains the mountains of Solryggen, Aagaardtoppen, Griegfjellet and Griegaksla. East of the ridge is the valley of Linnédalen.

References

Mountains of Spitsbergen